Jeff Kaake is an American actor best known for his portrayal of Paul Morrisey in Nasty Boys and Thomas Cole in Viper.

Filmography

Film

Television

References

External links 

1959 births
Living people
American male film actors
Male actors from Detroit